Duvaliomimus is a genus of beetles in the family Carabidae. It is endemic to New Zealand.

Species within genus

The genus contains the following species:

 Duvaliomimus australis Townsend, 2010
 Duvaliomimus brittoni Jeannel, 1938
 Duvaliomimus chrystallae Townsend, 2010
 Duvaliomimus crypticus Townsend, 2010
 Duvaliomimus mayae Britton, 1958
 Duvaliomimus megawattus Townsend, 2010
 Duvaliomimus obscurus Townsend, 2010
 Duvaliomimus orientalis Giachino, 2005
 Duvaliomimus pseudostyx Townsend, 2010
 Duvaliomimus styx Britton, 1959
 Duvaliomimus taieriensis Townsend, 2010
 Duvaliomimus walkeri (Broun, 1903)
 Duvaliomimus watti Britton, 1958

References

Trechinae
Endemic fauna of New Zealand
Beetles of New Zealand
Endemic insects of New Zealand